The Excise Bill of 1733 was a proposal by the British government of Robert Walpole to impose an excise tax on a variety of products. This would have allowed Customs officers to search private dwellings to look for contraband untaxed goods. The perceived violation of the Rights of Englishmen provoked widespread opposition and the bill was eventually withdrawn. Whig opposition MP William Pitt took the lead in criticising the proposal, invoking the concept that an "Englishman's house is his castle".

Walpole proposed the bill while at the height of his powers, during the Whig Ascendency, but its defeat was an early sign of the waning of his dominance over British politics which came to an end in 1742. Opposition Tory Mps were joined by the emerging Patriot Whigs to oppose the measure, signalling an alliance between these two forces.

Aftermath
Much of the ideology and arguments used against the bill in Britain, later influenced American resistance to the Stamp Act. Like the opposition to the Excise Bill, this focused on the argument that governments had a right to tax external trade through customs, but not to interfere in private exchanges by British subjects.

References

Bibliography
 
 
 

1733 in Great Britain
Robert Walpole